Stina Grenholm (born 1977) is a Swedish ski-orienteering competitor and world champion.

She won a gold medal in the middle distance at the 2002 World Ski Orienteering Championships in Borovetz, a bronze medal in 2004, and a second bronze medal in 2005 (shared with Stine Hjermstad Kirkevik).

She finished third overall in the World Cup in Ski Orienteering in 2003, behind Natalia Tomilova and Tatiana Vlasova.

References

1977 births
Living people
Swedish orienteers
Female orienteers
Ski-orienteers
21st-century Swedish women